
Thulamela is the most dramatic of the around 300 archaeological sites identified in Kruger National Park. It is located on heights south of the Levubu River offering a panoramic view. Sidney Miller led excavations from December 1993 to July 1995, and the site has also been partially reconstructed.

The opening of the rebuilt Thulamela was attended by a hundred guests, including then Minister of Environmental Affairs and Tourism Pallo Jordan and then SANParks chairman, the late Dr. Enos John Mabuza. The name Thulamela comes from a portmanteau of thulwi ("mound") and mela ("growing") in references to the tall anthills in the area.

The Makahane, a subtribe of the Vhalembeth branch of the Venda people, inhabited the Thulamela stone fortress from 1250 to 1700 C.E. Glass beads, Chinese porcelain, imported textiles, ivory bracelets, gold, bronze, and other jewelry testify to extensive trade links. Skilled goldsmiths, the inhabitants traded the metal as currency, and they also mined iron ore that they forged into iron for export. Both metals were traded for ivory, glass beads, and grain from merchants closer to the east coast. There were likely also trade links with West Africa.

The graves of a 16th-century king and queen were unearthed in the 1990s excavations. Archaeologists named them King Ingwe and Queen Losha, and their castle was estimated to house 1,000 people. Dwellings along the ruined walls on the hillsides beyond could regularly have housed 2,000. 

Similar village ruins can be found in the Mateke Hills on the other side of the Limpopo River in Zimbabwe. The Makahane Cliffs can be found in the same area of Kruger National Park, northeast of the Punda Maria Gate near the Levubu, and was also a Vhalembethu settlement.

Thulamela Kingdom was led by the Tswa people well-known as the Hlengwe (Tsonga). The last rightful ruler's actual names was Mahimi Mukhumuli Mabasa of Xitanga Mayingani Dynasty. 

Big five families of the Kingdom Thulamela:

 Forgotten Dynasty of Mabasa/Chauke — under ruler Mahimi Mkhumuli Mhlengwe wa Xitanga xa Mayingani
 Makahane — also known as Shagala, Nephawe, Mataji (Matandze)
 Pafuri — known as Makushu (Makush)
 Maphaha Xikumbu (Xikumbu) — son of Thonga Tshilimandila in Phalaborwa.
 Shilowa or Selowa — also known as Machete, Mmopa, Mushiana, Vudogwe, Mbwashishi, Senyolo or Vhadau Vha Damani & Vhadau Vha Matavhelani.

Visitors to the park can book tours from Punda Maria Camp up to Thulamela.

See also
 Great Zimbabwe
 Kingdom of Mapungubwe
 Makuleke tribe
 Shingwedzi

Sources 
 Miller, Sidney Mears (2018). Thulamela: The Lost Gold of the Vha Venda.

References

External links
 

Kruger National Park
Archaeological sites in South Africa
Archaeological sites of Southern Africa